Mohammad Ali Kaidi (Arabic:محمد علي كيدي) (born 23 September 1999) is an Emirati footballer who plays as a midfielder.

Career
Kaidi started his career at Al-Wasl and is a product of the Al-Wasl's youth system. On 26 May 2019, Kaidi made his professional debut for Al-Wasl against Ittihad Kalba in the Pro League .

References

External links
 

1999 births
Living people
Emirati footballers
Al-Wasl F.C. players
UAE Pro League players
Association football midfielders
Place of birth missing (living people)